Acetic oxalic anhydride is an organic compound with a chemical formula of  and a structural formula of (H3C-(C=O)-O-(C=O)-)2.  It can be viewed as a mixed anhydride, formally derived from acetic acid (H3C-(C=O)OH) and oxalic acid ((-(C=O)OH)2), in 2:1 molecular ratio, by the loss of two water molecules.

Preparation
Unlike some other anhydrides, Acetic oxalic anhydride cannot be obtained directly from the acids. It was synthesized in 1953 by W. Edwards and W. M. Henley, by reacting silver oxalate suspended in diethyl ether with acetyl chloride at temperatures below −5 °C and distilling off the solvent under low pressure. It can also be obtained by reacting anhydrous oxalic acid with ketene (=C=O).

Properties 
Acetic oxalic anhydride is an unstable colorless crystalline solid, soluble in diethyl ether, that decomposes at about −3 °C into acetic anhydride (-(C=O)-)2O, carbon dioxide and carbon monoxide (CO). It is hydrolyzed by water into acetic and oxalic acids.

Acetic oxalic anhydride was conjectured to be an intermediate in the decomposition of anhydrous oxalic acid by acetic anhydride.

See also
 Oxalic anhydride

References

Carboxylic anhydrides